Francisco Huenchumilla Jaramillo (born 22 March 1944) is a Chilean lawyer and christian-democratic politician of Mapuche descent, who has served as minister, deputy and senator.

External links
 BCN Profile

References

1944 births
Living people
Chilean people of Mapuche descent
20th-century Chilean lawyers
University of Chile alumni
20th-century Chilean politicians
21st-century Chilean politicians
Mapuche politicians
Christian Democratic Party (Chile) politicians
Mapuche lawyers
Senators of the LV Legislative Period of the National Congress of Chile
Senators of the LVI Legislative Period of the National Congress of Chile